Fordon may refer to:

Fordon, East Riding of Yorkshire, England
Fordon, Bydgoszcz, district in Bydgoszcz, Poland